Mount Douglas is located in the Absaroka Range, Gallatin National Forest in the U.S. state of Montana. Mount Douglas is the tallest peak in Sweet Grass County, Montana and is within the Absaroka-Beartooth Wilderness. Mount Douglas is named for E. M. Douglas, of the United States Geological Survey.

References

Douglas
Mountains of Sweet Grass County, Montana